Downstream is the second studio album by the San Francisco, California-based band New Monsoon. It was recorded over a period of months from February to November in 2002 and was released in early 2003.

Track listing
 Mountain Air
 Painted Moon
 Downstream
 Velvet Pouch
 Bo's Blues
 Ladybug
 Don't Feel Welcome
 Double Clutch
 Sunman
 One of These Days
 Chakar Dar D'Abaji
 Liquid Blue
 Circle

Personnel
New Monsoon:
Brian Carey - percussion, conga, timbales
Heath Carlisle - bass, guitar, vocals, engineer, mixing, photography, cover art
Phil Ferlino - organ, piano, keyboards, vocals, guitar, mixing, engineer
Rajiv Parikh - percussion, tabla, vocals
Bo Carper - acoustic guitar, banjo, dobro
Jeff Miller - guitar (electric), vocals (background)
Marty Ylitalo - drums, didjeridu

John Greenham - mastering

External links
New Monsoon
[ All Music entry]
Jeff Miller

2003 albums
New Monsoon albums